This is a list of both production and concept vehicles of the former Mercury division of Ford Motor Company of the United States and Canada.

Production models

Concept cars
Mercury Antser (1980)
Mercury Astron (1966)
Mercury Bahamian (1953)
Mercury Capri Guardsman (1980)
Mercury Comet Cyclone Sportster (1965)
Mercury Comet Escapade (1966)
Mercury Comet Fastback (1964)
Mercury Comet Super Cyclone (1964)
Mercury Concept 50 (1988)
Mercury Concept One (1989)
Mercury Cougar El Gato (1970)
Mercury Cougar Eliminator (1999)
Mercury Cougar S (1999)
Mercury Cyclone (1990)
Mercury Cyclone Super Spoiler (1969)
Mercury D528 "Beldone" (1955)
Mercury Escapade (1965)
Mercury Fusion (1996)
Mercury Gametime Villager (1999)
Mercury L'Attitude (1997)
Mercury LeGrand Marquis (1968)
Mercury LN7 PPG (1981)
Mercury Marauder Convertible (2002)
Mercury MC2 (1997)
Mercury MC4 (1997)
Mercury Messenger (2003)
Mercury Meta One (2005)
Mercury Montego Sportshauler (1971)
Mercury My (1999)
Mercury Mystique (concept), (1991)
Mercury One (1989)
Mercury Palomar (1962)
Mercury Premys (1994)
Mercury Super Marauder (1964)
Mercury Vanster (1985)
Mercury Wrist Twist Park Lane (1965)
Mercury XM-800 (1954)
Mercury XM (1979)
Mercury XM-Turnpike Cruiser (1956)

References

 
Mercury
.